Victor Thomas Hill (17 October 1926 – 3 November 2010) was an Australian rules footballer who played with Richmond and South Melbourne in the Victorian Football League (VFL).

Notes

External links 

Vic Hill's playing statistics from The VFA Project

1926 births		
2010 deaths		
Australian rules footballers from Victoria (Australia)		
Richmond Football Club players		
Sydney Swans players
Oakleigh Football Club players